William Lawson's is a blended Scotch whisky brand created in 1849 and belonging to Bacardi Limited. 

Is distilled and blended in the Macduff distillery alongside the Glen Deveron single malt whisky since the distillery was acquired by William Lawson Distillers Ltd in 1972. 

The brand is the world's 4th best-selling Scotch whisky with sales of 3.4 million cases in 2021. The brand have the best sales in France, Portugal, Spain and Mexico.

References 

Blended Scotch whisky

Bacardi